Chloritis macrostoma is a species of air-breathing land snail, a terrestrial pulmonate gastropod mollusk in the family Camaenidae.

Distribution 
The type locality is Bangaya, off East Sulawesi, Indonesia.

Shell description 
The shell is large for the genus, brown, without hairs, completely flat, umbilicated, the ends of the peristome connected with a thin callus. The width of the shell is 37–48 mm.

References
This article incorporates CC-BY-3.0 text from the reference.

External links

Camaenidae
Gastropods described in 1906